Kristin Godridge (born 7 February 1973) is a retired tennis player from Australia who competed on the WTA Tour from 1987 to 1996.

Career
Godridge achieved a career-high singles ranking of world No. 79 in September 1991. Her highest doubles ranking was No. 68 in December 1990.

With partner Kirrily Sharpe, Godridge was girls' doubles champion at the 1990 US Open. The following year, she teamed with Kirrily Sharpe to reclaim the title.  A highlight in her singles career came in 1992, when she reached the fourth round of Wimbledon. She had wins over Miriam Oremans, Claudia Kohde-Kilsch, and ninth-seed Manuela Maleeva-Fragniere before losing to third-seed Gabriela Sabatini.

As a tennis coach, Godridge is the director and founder of Australasia Tennis Aces, a tennis school in Hong Kong.

WTA career finals

Doubles: 2 (1 title, 1 runner-up)

ITF finals

Singles (2–4)

Doubles (5–6)

References

External links
 
 
 

1973 births
Living people
Australian female tennis players
US Open (tennis) junior champions
Grand Slam (tennis) champions in girls' doubles
Hong Kong female tennis players
Tennis people from Victoria (Australia)
People from Traralgon